Bernardo Pérez de Chinchón (c.1488/93 – 1556?) was a Valencian Roman Catholic writer.

Pérez de Chinchón translated Erasmus into Castilian. Employed by Juan de Borja, 3rd Duke of Gandía, he also wrote works of Christian apologetics directed against Islam.

Works
 (tr.) Erasmus, Silenos de Alcibíades (Adagia), Valencia: Jorge Costilla, 1528
 Libro llamado Antialcorano: que quiere dezir contra el Alcoran de Mahoma, Valencia, 1532
 Diálogos christianos contra la secta mahomética y contra la pertinacia de los judíos, Valencia: Francisco Díaz Romano, 1535.

References

External links
 Pérez de Chinchón, Bernardo

15th-century births
1556 deaths
Year of death uncertain
Christian critics of Islam
Christian apologists
16th-century Spanish writers
16th-century male writers
Latin–Spanish translators